Bernardo Zambernelli, O.F.M. Conv. or Bernardo di Giambernardello Pace da Carpi or Bernardo Pace (died 1425) was a Roman Catholic prelate who served as Bishop of Parma (1412–1425).

Biography
Bernardo Zambernelli was ordained a priest in the Order of Friars Minor Conventual.
In 1412, he was appointed during the papacy of Pope Gregory XII as Bishop of Parma.
He served as Bishop of Parma until his death on 11 Jul 1425.

References

External links and additional sources
 (for Chronology of Bishops) 
 (for Chronology of Bishops) 

15th-century Italian Roman Catholic bishops
Bishops appointed by Pope Gregory XII
1425 deaths
Conventual Franciscan bishops